Francis Henry Egerton, 8th Earl of Bridgewater,  (11 November 1756 – 11 February 1829), known as Francis Egerton until 1823, was a noted British eccentric from the Egerton family and supporter of natural theology.

Egerton was a Church of England clergyman who held the rectories of Myddle (1781) and Whitchurch (1797) in Shropshire, but the duties were performed by a proxy. He succeeded his brother John in the earldom in 1823, and spent the latter part of his life in Paris. He was a fair scholar, and a zealous naturalist and antiquarian. When he died in February 1829 the earldom became extinct.

Early life
Born in London in 1756, Egerton was the younger son of John Egerton, Bishop of Durham and Anne Sophia Grey. He was educated at Eton and Christ Church, Oxford where he gained his Bachelor of Arts in 1776, and became a fellow of All Souls in 1780, and Fellow of the Royal Society in 1781.  He inherited his title and a large fortune in 1823 from his brother, the 7th Earl.

Career
 
Egerton was eccentric. According to the Parisian police, Egerton kept dogs and cats in his house which he dressed as ladies and gentlemen and would take them with him in his carriage. he kept partridges and pigeons with clipped wings in his garden, allowing him to shoot them despite failing eyesight. He never married, and upon his death, his title became extinct. He was buried at Little Gaddesden, Hertfordshire.

In the early 17th century, Thomas Egerton, 1st Viscount Brackley, had purchased Ashridge House, one of the largest country houses in England, from Queen Elizabeth I, who had inherited it from her father who had appropriated it after the dissolution of the monasteries in 1539. Ashridge House served the Egerton family as a residence until the 19th century. The Egertons later had a family chapel (the Bridgewater Chapel) with burial vault in Little Gaddesden Church, where many monuments commemorate the Dukes and Earls of Bridgewater and their families.

Arts and science
He was invested as a Fellow of the Royal Society (F.R.S.) on 8 November 1781 and as a Fellow of the Society of Antiquaries of London (F.S.A.) on 31 March 1791.

In 1812 he wrote "Description du Plan Incliné Souterrain" about the underground canals of the Worsley Navigable Levels, coal mines in Worsley, Greater Manchester, part of the Bridgewater estate.

A Freemason who had been Initiated in France, from 10th August 1786 until 1800 Egerton was Provincial Grand Master for Shropshire and North Wales, adding Staffordshire, Flint, Denbighshire and Montgomeryshire to his responsibilities in 1791. For all that this was an extensive area, the duties associated with the position at that time were light, and in many cases (up to 1795) left in the hands of his Deputy/Provincial Grand Secretary Charles Shirreff. The Secretary of Whitchurch Lodge no. 1, John Collier, was one of the curates who deputised for Egerton at the church in the town.

Death and bequests
At his death his titles became extinct.

He bequeathed to the British Museum the valuable Egerton Manuscripts, consisting of 67 manuscripts dealing with the literature of France and Italy, and £12,000 to establish the Egerton Fund from which the Museum could purchase additional manuscripts. More than 3800 manuscripts have been purchased using the Egerton fund.

He also left £8,000 at the disposal of the president of the Royal Society, to be paid to the author or authors who might be selected to write and publish 1000 copies of a treatise "On the Power, Wisdom and Goodness of God, as manifested in the Creation". The resulting eight Bridgewater Treatises first appeared between 1833 and 1836, and afterwards in Bohn's Scientific Library.

See also
 Egerton Collection

Notes

References
 
 
 
  cite:
 
 
  

Attribution:

Further reading

 
 
 Topham, Jonathan (2022). Reading the Book of Nature How Eight Best Sellers Reconnected Christianity and the Sciences on the Eve of the Victorian Age. University of Chicago Press. .
 

08
Ordained peers
1756 births
1829 deaths
People educated at Eton College
Alumni of Christ Church, Oxford
Francis
Fellows of the Royal Society